Pseudodiptera clypeatus is a moth of the family Erebidae. It was described by Sergius G. Kiriakoff in 1965. It is found in the Democratic Republic of the Congo.

References

Syntomini
Moths described in 1965
Endemic fauna of the Democratic Republic of the Congo